Ḷ (minuscule: ḷ) is a letter of the Latin alphabet, derived from L with a diacritical dot below. It is or was used in some languages to represent various sounds.

In Asturian, a digraph (Ḷḷ, lower case: ḷḷ) is used to represent some western dialectal phonemes corresponding to standard ll (representing a palatal lateral approximant ). Among this group of dialectal pronunciations, usually called che vaqueira, can appear basically: a voiced retroflex plosive , a voiced retroflex affricate , a voiceless retroflex affricate  and a voiceless alveolar affricate . Formerly, this group of sounds were represented as lh (in Fernán Coronas's proposed writing system), ts or ŝ. However, this grapheme is used only in dialectal texts and in toponyms of western Asturias. Because of the difficulties of writing it in digital texts, non-diacritical l.l (majuscule: L.l) is also often used.

In the International Alphabet of Sanskrit Transliteration, ḷ is used to represent vocalic .

It is used to represent a retroflex lateral approximant /ɭ/ in several modern language of South Asia when using ISO 15919 or similar transliteration schemes.

It is used to represent a voiced palatal lateral approximant [ʎ] in Iñupiaq.

Computer encoding 
HTML characters and Unicode code point numbers:
 Ḷ: &#7734; or &#x1e36; – 
 ḷ: &#7735; or &#x1e37; –

References

Latin letters with diacritics
Asturian language

ast:Ḷḷ
no:Ḷḷ (bokstav)